Olethreutes permundana, the raspberry leafroller, is a species of tortricid moth in the family Tortricidae. It is found in the eastern United States, south-eastern Canada and north-western North America. The species was described by James Brackenridge Clemens in 1860.

The wingspan is 17–22 mm.

The larvae are leaftiers and have been recorded on Spiraea salicifolia, Physocarpus opulifolius, Rubus hispidus, Rosa, Fragaria, Vaccinium pallidum, Gaylussacia, Rhus typhina, Corylus, Myrica and Carya.

The MONA or Hodges number for Olethreutes permundana is 2817.

References

Further reading

 Arnett, Ross H. (2000). American Insects: A Handbook of the Insects of America North of Mexico. CRC Press.

Olethreutini
Moths described in 1860